Lacinipolia davena, the red-spot polia, is a species of cutworm or dart moth in the family Noctuidae. It is found in North America.

The MONA or Hodges number for Lacinipolia davena is 10407.

References

Further reading

 
 
 
 

Eriopygini
Articles created by Qbugbot
Moths described in 1901